The year 1583 in science and technology included a number of events, some of which are listed here.

Botany
 Carolus Clusius publishes Rariorum stirpium per Pannonias observatorum Historiae, the earliest book on Alpine flora.

Mathematics
 Thomas Fincke's Geometria rotundi is published, introducing the terms tangent and secant for trigonometric functions.
 Johann Thomas Freigius'  is published in Basel following his death (January 16) from plague.

Physiology and medicine
 Georg Bartisch's Ophthalmodouleia, Das ist Augendienst is published in Dresden, the first modern work on ophthalmology.

Births
 February 23 – Jean-Baptiste Morin, French mathematician, astronomer, and astrologer (died 1656)

Deaths
 December 31 – Thomas Erastus, Swiss physician and theologian (born 1524)

References

 
16th century in science
1580s in science